In Telangana, the Sasana Sabha or Legislative Assembly, has 119 constituencies. 18
constituencies are reserved for the Scheduled Castes candidates and 9 constituencies are reserved for the Scheduled tribes candidates.

Below is the list of constituencies, along with the district and Lok Sabha constituency that they lie in.

List of current constituencies

List of former constituencies 
The following were the assembly constituencies discontinued from the year 2008 in response to the Delimitaion Act, 2002 in the erstwhile United Andhra Pradesh. 
Following district classification is based on old districts in the erstwhile United Andhra Pradesh

See also 
List of constituencies of the Lok Sabha

References

External links
 

Telangana